KF Shemshova 1984 (FK Šemševo 1984) is a football club based in the village of Shemshevë, Tetovo, North Macedonia. They are currently competing in the OFS Tetovo league.

History
The club was founded in 1984.

References

External links
Shemshova 1984 Facebook 
Club info at MacedonianFootball 
Football Federation of Macedonia 

Shemshova 1984
Association football clubs established in 1984
1984 establishments in the Socialist Republic of Macedonia
FK
Shemshova